Zurab Karumidze is a Georgian writer and culturologist, born August 22, 1957, in Tbilisi. He graduated from Ivane Javakhishvili Tbilisi State University, the faculty of Western European languages and literature with the major in English literature.

Information
Zurab Karumidze, born in 1957, studied English language and literature at Tbilisi State University, where he wrote a dissertation on John Donne. For several years he was a research associate at the Centre for Twentieth Century Literary Studies at Tbilisi State University.

In 1994–95 he was a Fulbright Scholar at the University of Wisconsin-Milwaukee, working on postmodern American metafiction. Two of his short stories were published in English in Clockwatch Review (Bloomington IL 1996).

He was appointed editor of the Tbilisi-based English-language literary magazines Georgia/Caucasus Profile (1995–2000) and Caucasus Context (2002–2005).

He is the author of a collection of short stories entitled 'Opera' (1998) and of several novels, including 'The Wine-dark Sea' (2000) and 'Gigo and the Goat' (2003). He co-edited 'Enough! Rose Revolution in the Republic of Georgia' (Nova Science Publishers, New York 2005) and has written numerous essays on philosophy, cultural history, collective memory and folk tales, as well as an award-winning book on the history of jazz (2010). His literary works are highly intellectual and experimental as well as being full of references and allusions to Western literature.

Books
 Opera, a collection of short stories (1988)
 Wine Dark Sea, a novel (2000)
 Goat and Gigo, a novel (2003)
 Dagny, or a Love Feast, a novel in English language (2011)
 Life of Jazz, documentary prose (2009)
 Caucasian Foxtrot (2011)  
 Bashi-Achuki or Moby Dick (2013)
 Jazzmine (2014)

Translations
 Dagny, or a Love Feast, in English language, Dalkey Archive Press (2013)
 Dagny oder Ein Fest der Liebe, in German, Weidle Verlag, 2017

Awards
Literary Award "Saba" in the nomination "The Best Criticism, Essayistic and Documentary Prose of the Year" for the book "Life of Jazz" (2010)

References

External links
 KARUMIDZE ZURAB
 Books by Zurab Karumidze
 Dagny
 ZURAB KARUMIDZE

Male writers from Georgia (country)
1957 births
Living people
Writers from Tbilisi
Tbilisi State University alumni
Novelists from Georgia (country)
Translators from Georgia (country)
20th-century writers from Georgia (country)
21st-century writers from Georgia (country)
Postmodern writers
Magic realism writers